The Grand Tours are the three most prestigious multi-week stage races in professional road bicycle racing. The competitions are the Giro d'Italia, Tour de France and Vuelta a España, contested annually in that order. They are the only stage races permitted to last longer than 14 days. No cyclist has won all three Grand Tours in the same calendar year, but Eddy Merckx, Bernard Hinault and Chris Froome have won all three in succession (thus holding all titles at the same time); the only other cyclists to win all three Grand Tours at some point in their career are Jacques Anquetil, Felice Gimondi, Alberto Contador, and Vincenzo Nibali. Contador is the youngest, at 25 years, to win every Tour. It is rare for cyclists to ride all Grand Tours in the same year; in 2004, for example, 474 cyclists started in one of the Grand Tours, 68 rode two and only two cyclists started all three.

Cyclists are ranked on the basis of their total wins in the three Grand Tours. When there is a tie between cyclists they are listed alphabetically by the Grand Tour they won. The majority of winners have come from Europe, however, there have been a few notable victories for cyclists from other continents. Andrew Hampsten, became the first North American to win the Giro, when he won in 1988. Luis Herrera became the first person from South America and the Southern Hemisphere to win a Grand Tour when he won the 1987 Vuelta a España.

Eddy Merckx, with 11 victories, has won the most Grand Tours. Bernard Hinault is second with 10 and Jacques Anquetil is third with eight. Merckx, Fausto Coppi and Alfredo Binda have won the most Giros, each winning five during their career. Merckx, Hinault, Anquetil and Miguel Indurain hold the record for the most victories in the Tour, with five each. Roberto Heras holds the record for the most victories in the Vuelta, which he has won four times.

Winners

By cyclist

Riders in bold are still active. Number of wins in gold indicates the current record holder(s).

By country

References

General
 
 
 

Specific

Lists of cyclists
Grand Tour (cycling)